Sunrise Records and Entertainment, trading as HMV (for His Master's Voice), is a British music and entertainment retailer, currently operating exclusively in the United Kingdom.

The first HMV-branded store was opened by the Gramophone Company on London's Oxford Street in 1921, and the HMV name was also used for television and radio sets manufactured from the 1930s onwards. The retail side of the business began to expand in the 1960s, and in 1998 was divested from EMI, the successor to the Gramophone Company, to form what would become HMV Group. HMV stands for His Master's Voice, the title of a painting by Francis Barraud of Nipper listening to a Phonograph cylinder, bought by the Gramophone Company in 1899. For advertising purposes this was changed to a wind-up gramophone, and eventually used simply as a silhouette. HMV owned the Waterstones bookshop chain from 1998 until 2011, and has owned the music retailer Fopp since August 2007. It purchased a number of former Zavvi stores in February 2009, and also branched into live music venue management that year by purchasing MAMA Group. It sold the group in December 2012.

On 15 January 2013, HMV Group plc entered administration; HMV Ireland declared receivership and all Irish stores were closed. The sale of HMV's Hong Kong and Singapore business to private equity firm Aid Partners was completed on 28 February 2013. On 5 April 2013, HMV was bought out of administration by Hilco UK for an estimated £50 million. HMV Group plc, which had been listed on the London Stock Exchange and was a constituent of the FTSE Fledgling Index, was liquidated in July 2014. HMV Canada is a former subsidiary which was sold to Hilco by the HMV Group in 2011. HMV Canada went into receivership in 2017 after being sued by Huk 10 Ltd., a shell company owned by Hilco. On 28 December 2018, HMV announced that the company had once again fallen into administration.

On 5 February 2019, HMV was acquired by the Canadian company Sunrise Records, which had bought the leases for 70 former HMV Canada properties in an effort to continue operating them as record stores. Sunrise planned to emulate the growth strategies it had used in Canada, including leveraging the vinyl revival. On 12 October 2019, Sunrise Records opened The Vault in Birmingham, the largest HMV record store.

History

Origins

The antecedents of HMV began in the 1890s at the dawn of the disc gramophone. By 1902 it had become the beginnings of the Gramophone Company. In February 1907 it commenced the building of a new dedicated record factory at Hayes, Middlesex. Disc records were sold in music shops and independent retailers at this time. In 1921 the Gramophone Company opened the first dedicated HMV shop at 363 Oxford Street, London, in a former men's clothing shop; the composer Edward Elgar participated in the opening ceremonies. In March 1931 the Gramophone Company merged with Columbia Graphophone Company to form Electric and Musical Industries Ltd (EMI).

From the 1930s onwards, HMV manufactured radio and television sets and radiograms under the HMV and Marconiphone brand names in its factory in Hayes, Middlesex.

The original HMV shop was severely damaged by a fire in 1937, but was rebuilt and reopened two years later on 8 May 1939. Sir Thomas Beecham opened the new store.

Expansion

In 1966, HMV began expanding its retail operations in London. Throughout the 1970s, the company continued to expand, doubling in size, and in six years became the country's leading specialist music retailer. It faced strong competition, however, from Virgin Megastores, established in 1976, and from Our Price, established in 1972, which had numerous high street retail stores around the UK. Subsequently, HMV overtook Our Price in popularity and threatened its existence, having established a chain of newer and larger stores.

The company opened its flagship store at a new location at 150-154 Oxford Street in 1986, announcing it was the largest record store in the world at the time, and the official opening was attended by Bob Geldof and Michael Hutchence. Growth continued for a third decade into the 1990s, with the company reaching over 320 stores including in 1990 its first store in the U.S. located at 86th and Lexington in New York City, which was the largest music shop in North America at the time. HMV celebrated its 75-year anniversary in 1996.

In February 1998, EMI entered into a joint venture with Advent International to form HMV Media Group led by Alan Giles, which acquired HMV's stores and Dillons, leaving EMI with a holding of around 45%. The new joint venture then bought the Waterstones chain of bookshops to merge with Dillons.

Flotation
By 2002, EMI's holding in HMV Media was 43%, with Advent International owning 40% and management the remainder. The company floated on the London Stock Exchange later in the year as HMV Group plc, leaving EMI with only a token holding.

The group became susceptible to a takeover following a poor period of trading up to Christmas 2005. Private equity firm Permira made a £762 million conditional bid for the group (based on 190p a share) on 7 February 2006, which was rejected by HMV as an insufficient valuation of the company. Permira made a second offer which increased the value, although HMV declined it on 13 March 2006, subsequently issuing a statement that the offer undervalued the medium and long term prospects for the company, resulting in Permira withdrawing from bidding.

Acquisitions

In 2006, the HMV Group purchased the Ottakar's book chain and merged it into Waterstones. The merger tied into HMV's strategy for growth, as many of the Ottakar's branches were in smaller towns. The Competition Commission provisionally cleared HMV Group, through Waterstones, for takeover of the Ottakar's group on 30 March 2006, stating that the takeover would "not result in a substantial lessening of competition". Waterstones then announced that it had successfully negotiated a takeover of Ottakar's on 31 May 2006. All 130 Ottakar's stores were rebranded as Waterstones prior to Christmas 2006. In March 2007, new group CEO Simon Fox announced a 10% reduction over three years in the enlarged Waterstones total store space, comprising mostly dual location shops created by the acquisition of Ottakar's.

On 29 June 2007, the entertainment retailer Fopp went into administration, with the closure of 81 stores and 800 staff made redundant. On 31 July HMV bought the brand and six stores that it said had traded profitably, saving around 70 jobs.

On 24 December 2008, HMV's rival Zavvi, also an entertainment retailer, entered administration. On 14 January 2009 a placing announcement by HMV revealed that it intended to acquire 14 of Zavvi's stores. On 18 February 2009 five additional Zavvi stores were purchased by HMV Group, to be rebranded as HMV outlets. An additional former Zavvi store in Exeter's Princesshay development was also added. The acquisitions were investigated and cleared by the Office of Fair Trading in April 2009.

In the 2008 MCV Industry Excellence Awards, HMV was given the title Entertainment Retailer of the Year.

In January 2009, HMV bought a 50% stake in MAMA Group, forming a joint venture with the group called the Mean Fiddler Group. The deal introduced the HMV brand to live music venues, including the Hammersmith Apollo. On 23 December 2009, it bought the whole of the MAMA Group in a live music takeover deal worth £46 million.

HMV bought 50% of 7digital for £7.7 million in September 2009, as part of a strategy to increase its digital content offering. 7digital provided HMV's music download service, and the company planned to introduce an e-books service for Waterstone's.

On 5 January 2011, HMV announced that profits would be at the lower end of analysts' forecasts due to falling sales, resulting in the share price falling by 20% and an announcement of the group's intention to close 40 HMV stores, as well as 20 Waterstone's stores, mainly in towns and cities where the company operated at multiple locations. The first of the store closures began at the end of January 2011.

The sale of Waterstone's to A&NN Capital Fund Management for £53 million was completed on 29 June 2011, and was approved by the vast majority of shareholders at an emergency general meeting.

HMV sold the Hammersmith Apollo to AEG Live and Eventim in May 2012 for £32 million. It sold the remainder of MAMA Group to Lloyds Development Capital in December 2012 for £7.3 million, which also included the company's 50% stake in Mean Fiddler Group.

Administration (2013)

On 15 January 2013, HMV Group appointed Deloitte as company administrators. and suspended shares, putting its 4,350 UK employees at the risk of redundancy. Store gift vouchers were initially declared void since holders are classified as unsecured creditors to whom the company owed the value, but were accepted again from 22 January 2013. HMV Ireland followed by declaring receivership on 16 January 2013, which required the company under Irish law to close all its stores immediately.

Restructuring firm Hilco UK bought HMV's debt from its creditors The Royal Bank of Scotland and Lloyds Banking Group, as a step towards potentially taking control of the company. It was revealed that the total debt Hilco had bought amounted to around £110 million, and that HMV owed around £20 million in tax to HM Revenue and Customs at the time of its entry into administration.

On 31 January 2013, it was reported that 190 redundancies had been made at the head office and distribution centres.

On 7 February 2013, Deloitte confirmed that 66 stores had been identified for closure. No fixed date was given for the closures but they were expected to take place in the following two months. The next day, Deloitte confirmed that an additional 60 redundancies, including the chief executive Trevor Moore, had been made at the group's offices in London, Marlow and Solihull. Deloitte confirmed on 20 February 2013 that an additional 37 stores would close. On 26 February 2013, six stores were sold to supermarket chain Morrisons.

On 28 February 2013, eight stores in Hong Kong and Singapore were sold to AID Partners Capital Limited and the operation then became independent from HMV Group that was bought by Hilco UK.  This transaction also enabled AID Partners Capital Limited to own the rights to use the HMV brand in Hong Kong, Macau, China, Taiwan and Singapore.

By 23 March 2013, Deloitte was seeking to complete a deal to sell 120 stores as a going concern. The decision to close several stores that had previously been identified for closure were reversed following talks with landlords.

By 21 March 2016, China 3D Digital Entertainment Limited acquired HMV Hong Kong operations from AID Partners Capital Limited, later renamed to HMV Digital China Group Limited.

Hilco ownership (2013–2019)

On 5 April 2013, Hilco UK announced that it had acquired HMV, taking the company out of administration and saving 141 of its stores and around 2,500 jobs. The total included 25 stores that had previously been selected for closure by Deloitte during the administration process. All nine Fopp stores which HMV owned were also included in the purchase. Hilco also stated that it hoped to reopen an HMV store in Ireland following the closure of all stores in the country. The takeover deal was estimated at around £50 million.

On 9 June 2013, it was confirmed that Hilco Capital Ireland had purchased HMV Ireland, and would reopen five stores within six weeks.

The company moved its flagship Oxford Street store back to the original site at 363 Oxford Street on 23 October 2013. HMV's existing flagship store at 150-154 Oxford Street, formerly the largest music store in the world, closed on 14 January 2014.

By 2014, HMV had gained the second highest share of the UK entertainment market, behind Amazon. The company's filing to Companies House in September 2014 revealed it had made a profit of £17 million in the 11 months since it had entered administration. In January 2015, HMV overtook Amazon to become the largest retailer of physical music in the UK.

However, the originally safe stores of York, Soilhull, Portsmouth and Belfast would shut.

Sunrise ownership (2019–present) 

On 28 December 2018, HMV confirmed it had again been placed into administration. Hilco UK cited the "tsunami" of retail competition as the reason for the move. On 5 February 2019, Canadian record store chain Sunrise Records announced its acquisition of HMV Retail Ltd. from Hilco UK for an undisclosed amount. Sunrise had previously acquired the leases for over 70 HMV locations in Canada after HMV Canada entered receivership, which expanded the Ontario-based retailer into a national chain. Sunrise plans to maintain the HMV chain and five Fopp stores, but immediately closed 27 locations, including the flagship Oxford Street branch and other locations with high rent costs.

Company founder Doug Putman stated that he planned to increase the chain's emphasis on vinyl phonograph sales as part of the turnaround plan: Sunrise's leverage of the vinyl revival had helped bolster the Canadian locations' performance after the shops' transitions from HMV, having sold at least 500,000 vinyl LPs in 2017 alone. Putman argued that, despite the growth of digital music sales and streaming, "talk about the demise of the physical business is sometimes a bit exaggerated, especially in music specialists. Most of the decline is coming from nontraditional sellers like the grocery chains. We'll be here for quite some time."

On 25 February 2019, the Financial Times reported that the Sunrise acquisition was valued at £883,000. Following subsequent negotiations with its landlords, by late-February, HMV reopened 13 of its stores (including one Fopp store).

In October 2019, the new owners opened the HMV Vault on Dale End, Birmingham, billed as Europe's biggest entertainment store and stocking tens of thousands of CDs and vinyl records and other products.

COVID-19 pandemic and 100th Birthday (2020-2021) 
From 22 March to 15 June, and then from 5 November to 2 December 2020 and from 4 January 2021 to 12 April 2021 (in England), all HMV stores were closed because of the COVID-19 pandemic.

Into the 2020s, HMV began opening new and relocated stores, including in locations which previously had HMV branches that had earlier shut, such as Solihull. In some cases these new outlets were opened in stores vacated by the demise of other retail chains, particularly Arcadia Group, with an HMV store opened in Dunfermline premises previously occupied by Burton Menswear and Dorothy Perkins, a return to Broadway Shopping Centre, Bexleyheath - again in former Burton/Perkins premises - nine years after the closure of their previous store in the town, and a relocation in Wigan from a smaller prior site to larger premises vacated by Topshop/Topman.

In July 2021, HMV celebrated its 100th birthday. In celebration, the firm released 37 limited edition vinyl albums. A 100 track CD compilation entitled Now That's What I Call HMV was also released. The album was only available to buy at HMV stores, and online on HMV's website, plus eBay.

Operations

Following the purchase by Hilco UK, it was reported that the company was seeking to reduce the number of store staff across the business, as part of an effort to save £7.8 million on the wages budget. Stores would lose security staff, cashiers and supervisors, with managers required to provide cover.

As of August 2016, all HMV stores in the Republic of Ireland had closed down and replaced with an online store. HMV Belfast in Northern Ireland, which re-opened up in March 2014 after a £1 million pound refurbishment, was threatened with closure in February 2019. However, a deal was reached with Frasers Group which allowed the store to continue trading.

HMV established a joint venture with Curzon Cinemas in October 2009 as part of chief executive Simon Fox's plan to bring cinemas to HMV and Waterstone's stores across England. The first trial cinema opened above the existing HMV store in Wimbledon, in a former storage room converted into three separate screens and a bar. It has its own entrance, allowing access outside store hours, and one within the store. The trial was deemed a success, and it had been planned to open additional cinemas in HMV's Cheltenham store, and Waterstone's in Piccadilly, London.

In June 2015, HMV relaunched an online store to accompany its existing music download service.

One store in Singapore and five in Hong Kong, owned by the private equity firm AID Partners, traded under the HMV brand independently of the UK operations. These have since closed, with the Singapore store closing in 2015 and the final Hong Kong branch closing in 2018.

Product range
HMV stores stock a range of products including audio, Blu-rays, CDs, audio cassettes, vinyl records, DVDs, record players and headphones as well as an increasing range of film, television and music merchandise.

HMV launched a music download service in October 2013 (www.hmvdigital.com), provided by 7digital, which includes iOS and Android apps.

HMV relaunched its online store in June 2015, providing CDs, DVDs, Blu-ray Discs, and LP records for online order and home delivery with exclusive stock also available.

More recently, HMV has given extra focus to the rising trend of popular culture merchandise and launched a highly successful "Sweet Treats" range of Japanese and American sweets and drinks in 2020.

Loyalty programme
On 1 September 2008, HMV launched "Get Closer", a social networking site allowing users to import their own music library, rivalling other providers including online music stores Napster and the iTunes Store. The site was closed in September 2009.

HMV operated a loyalty scheme branded as "purehmv", first launched in August 2003, but subsequently closed and relaunched in 2008. The scheme awarded cardholders points for purchases, which could be collected and redeemed on a number of rewards including vouchers to spend in-store, memorabilia and signed merchandise. "purehmv" has since closed and will be replaced by a new loyalty scheme, the launch date of which is yet to be announced.

See also
 HMV's Poll of Polls

References

External links
 
 
 HMV online store
 https://moeb.ca 

1921 establishments in England
Retail companies based in London
British companies established in 1921
Retail companies established in 1921
2019 mergers and acquisitions
Companies that have entered administration in the United Kingdom
Defunct retail companies of the United States
Music retailers of the United Kingdom
Retail companies of the United Kingdom
Video game retailers in the United Kingdom

bn:এইচএমভি গ্রুপ